Jeff Errington FRS, FMedSci is a British microbiologist, and Director of the Centre for Bacterial Cell Biology (CBCB), at Newcastle University.

Life
He was Professor of Microbiology at the University of Oxford and a Fellow of Wadham College, Oxford. He is a fellow of the Royal Society.

He scientific founder of Demuris.
He is a Director at Biota Holdings Ltd.

References

External links 

 

British microbiologists
Academics of Newcastle University
Statutory Professors of the University of Oxford
Fellows of Wadham College, Oxford
Living people
Fellows of the Royal Society
Year of birth missing (living people)